All Ceylon Jamiyyathul Ulama (ACJU)  (in  ) is the apex religious body of Islamic theologians that provides religious and community leadership to the Sri Lankan Muslim Community, who are 9.6% of the population of the country.  It was established in 1924 and incorporated by Act No. 51 of 2000 of the Parliament of the Democratic Socialist Republic of Sri Lanka. ACJU has established 25 districts and 102 divisional branches, and enrolled over 5000 theologians, most of whom are holders of doctorates, special degrees, master's degree or 1st degrees.

Primary Goals

Sub Divisions
The ACJU consists of: the Council for Cooperation and Coordination (CCC), Social Service Division, Education, Fatwa Division, Public relations, Hilal (Crescent) division, Research and publishing division, Youth affairs, Women's affairs, Ulama affairs, Division for branch organizing, Maktab, and Islamic economics and finance divisions.

As part of the Islamic economics and finance division, members also visit funeral houses to observe if assistance is needed to solve any legal issues arising from the death.

The Maktab project was launched In an environment where the madrasah education system and the remuneration of scholars was in disarray by the ACJU in 2011, with the objective of standardizing the process in all madrasahs enabling students to read the Al Qur'an with Tajweed, learn Islamic etiquettes & the foundations of Islam and gain familiarity of the Qur'anic Arabic Language within a short period of time. The curriculum and program structure was developed by Aalims who studied similar systems in India and South Africa, with them providing the knowledge transfer and initial training to get it underway. The project is now in place in Masjids around the island with classes currently conducted at three grade levels, which over the next two years will increase to 5.

Executive members

Controversies

Child Marriage and MMDA 
In the past, the ACJU has justified and supported the Muslim Marriage and Divorce Act which allows child marriage for Muslims and even minors under 12 can be married off with a special permission from an Islamic magistrate. Further all divorce issues are handled by quazi courts which frequently discriminate and abuse female victims of domestic abuse and the woman can't even choose to be represented by a lawyer. Further females are banned from becoming . 
In January 2021, the ACJU published the Report on Muslim Marriage and Divorce Act by Union of Religious Scholars in which it supports the amendment of most of the controversial parts of the MMDA. For instance it proposes to raise the age of marriage to 18 years old for Muslim male and female.

Female Genital Mutilation 
The ACJU has demanded that the Sri Lankan government legalize Female Circumcision claiming that it is different from Female Genital Mutilation despite the World Health Organisation (WHO) classifying FGM as "procedures that intentionally alter or cause injury to the female genital organs for non-medical reasons"  and have claimed it as an "obligatory Islamic duty" and according to Al Jazeera victims of FGM are threatened if they speak out. Further the ACJU claim that the process provides numerous health benefits to women despite the WHO stating that the procedure has no health benefits for girls and women. Instead the WHO state the process is painful and traumatic and interferes with the natural functioning of the body causing several immediate and long-term health consequences such as excessive bleeding, swelling of genital tissue and problems urinating, and severe infections that can lead to shock and in some cases, death, as well as complications in childbirth and increased risk of perinatal deaths. Supporters of FGM have claimed it to be a mere  harmless "nick" to the clitoral hood and cannot be compared to other forms of FGM. However the process often carried out on infants may expose nerves making intercourse a painful and unpleasant experience. In 2017 Al Jazeera exposed the effects of FGM in Sri Lanka with the title "FGM in Sri Lanka: It's never 'just a nick'".

See also 
 List of Deobandi organisations

References

External links
ACJU Official Website
ACJU to stop issuing halaal certificates
All Ceylon Jamiyyathul Ulama (ACJU) Meets Muslim Ministers and MPs
All Ceylon Jamiyyathul Ulama sets record straight over ill-informed misconceptions
ACJU CLEARS THE AIR ON HALAL CERTIFICATION
ACJU wants Govt. to issue halal certification
ACJU to remove Halal logo in SL
ACJU stops issuance of Halal certificates; separate company to take over operations

Islamic organisations based in Sri Lanka
Islamic organizations established in 1924
Deobandi organisations